Veolia Water Technologies & Solutions (formerly SUEZ Water Technologies & Solutions) is a water technology company. It is part of Veolia Group and has operations in 130 countries in a variety of industries, including food and beverage, metals and mining, power, pharmaceutical, oil and gas, chemicals, petrochemicals, pulp and paper, and utilities.

History
William H. Betz and L. Drew Betz founded Betz as a water purification business in Philadelphia, Pennsylvania, in 1925. It later became Betz Laboratories and then Betz International.

BetzDearborn & Hercules, Inc.
In 1996, Betz acquired the Grace Dearborn water-treatment and process chemicals business from W. R. Grace and Company At that time Dearborn had 2,500 employees and sales of $400 million per year, while Betz claimed 4,100 employees and $800 million in revenue.
In 1998, the combined BetzDearborn Inc. was acquired by Hercules Inc. for $2.4 billion in cash and $700 million in assumed debt.

GE Betz
In 2002, General Electric acquired BetzDearborn from Hercules Inc. and became known as GE Betz and was part of GE Infrastructure. At that time, the company had approximately $1 billion in revenue and a sales force of 2,000. In the years that followed its purchase of BetzDearborn, GE also acquired Osmonics, Inc., Ionics, and membrane producer Zenon Environmental Systems, and by 2006 had combined them into GE Water & Process Technologies In 2008, GE restructured its subsidiaries and GE Water & Process Technologies became part of GE Energy Infrastructure. In 2012, GE Energy was reorganized and the original Betz operations and the rest of GE Water & Process Technologies are now part of GE Power & Water

Suez
In 2017, Suez closed on the purchase of GE Water and Process Technologies

Notes

General Electric Infrastructure subsidiaries
Companies based in Bucks County, Pennsylvania
Water companies of the United States
American companies established in 1925
1925 establishments in Pennsylvania